Douglas Robert Halward (born November 1, 1955) is a Canadian former professional ice hockey defenceman who played 663 games in the National Hockey League (NHL) for the Boston Bruins, Los Angeles Kings, Vancouver Canucks, Detroit Red Wings and Edmonton Oilers. He helped the Bruins reach the 1977 Stanley Cup Finals and the Canucks reach the 1982 Stanley Cup Finals.

Halward was born in Toronto, Ontario. He played junior hockey for the Peterborough Petes. As a youth, he played in the 1968 Quebec International Pee-Wee Hockey Tournament with the Toronto Young Nationals minor ice hockey team.

Career statistics

Regular season and playoffs

International

References

External links

1955 births
Living people
Adirondack Red Wings players
Boston Bruins draft picks
Boston Bruins players
Canadian ice hockey defencemen
Dallas Black Hawks players
Detroit Red Wings players
Edmonton Oilers players
Ice hockey people from Toronto
Los Angeles Kings players
National Hockey League first-round draft picks
Peterborough Petes (ice hockey) players
Quebec Nordiques (WHA) draft picks
Rochester Americans players
Springfield Indians players
Vancouver Canucks players